Monica Rawlins (1903-1990) was a British poster designer and artist.

Rawlins studied at the Central School of Arts and Crafts in London from 1925 to 1928. She created numerous poster designs for London transport, including for London County Council Tramways, in the 1920s. A portrait of her daughter, painted in 1946, was part of the exhibition Writing the Century: The View from the Windows. She died in 1990. The Victoria and Albert Museum in London holds examples of her work.

References

1903 births
1990 deaths
20th-century British artists
20th-century British women artists
Alumni of the Central School of Art and Design
People associated with transport in London
Transport design in London